Mem Saheb is a 1972 Bengali film directed by Pinaki Mukherjee. Pinaki Mukherjee also acting this film. This film produced by Ashima Bhattacharya and production company by Pompy Films. The story was based on the novel of same name by Nimai Bhattachariya. The film has been music composed by Ashima Bhattacharya. This film won the Filmfare Awards East in 1972. It stars Uttam Kumar and Aparna Sen in lead role. Others Gita Dey, Sumitra Mukherjee, Bikash Roy, Jahor Roy in the supporting roles.

Director Pinaki Mukherjee did a superb job by combining the political world and romance of that period. Aparna Sen excelled as the young, educated Professor, who falls in love with a hotshot journalist played by Kumar. While both stand for each other and dream for a happy future, which is cut short by political violence. This film, despite its romantic elements, brought the ethics of journalism to the big screen.

Cast
 Uttam Kumar as Amit
 Aparna Sen as Kajal
 Gita Dey
 Sumitra Mukherjee
 Bikash Roy
 Jahor Roy
 Lolita Chatterjee
 Dilip Mukherjee
 Pinaki Mukherjee
 Gour Shee

Production
The film was directed by Pinaki Bhusan Mukherjee and produced by Ashima Bhattachriya, she also composed the music. This producer director duo worked with Uttam Kumar before in the cult hit Chowrangee in 1968. At first the role of Kajal Suchitra Sen was the first choice but later she was found not suitable for this role then Aparna Sen is selected for this role. The indoor scenes of the film was shooted in Technicians Studio and NT Studio 2 (New Theaters).

Soundtrack

Reception
This is one of the best film for both Uttam Kumar and Aparna Sen's career. Uttam Kumar performance again huge acclaimed. The Times Of India wrote Uttam Kumar, playing her male counterpart, turns out to be her only inspiration. In this romantic drama, the legendary actor essayed out a hotshot journalist who  enjoys great connections to several political personalities. The film become blockbuster hit and ran to full houses for 12 consecutive weeks and total ran over 100 days in theaters. The film also become highest grossing bengali films in 1972.

Awards

References

External links
 
 
 Mem Saheb at The Times of India

Bengali-language Indian films
1972 films
1970s Bengali-language films